Lucia is a hamlet located in the south region of Big Sur, California. Wilber Judson Harlan filed the first patent for land in the area in 1885. His family has continually resided in the location and the fifth generation still operates a hotel alongside the Big Sur Coast Highway. The lodge is one of a very few along the south coast of Big Sur to offer accommodations to travelers. A small store and restaurant were destroyed by a fire in August 2021. The area is sparsely settled and Lucia miles away from any other business. Due to the remote location, gas prices are typically high.

History 

The land may have first been occupied the Salinan Antonianos subtribe who are believed to have lived on the coast and inland as far north as Soledad. It's believed the northern limit of the tribe along the Santa Lucia Mountains is Junipero Serra Peak, east of Slates Hot Springs. The Salinan named it Pimkolam.  The tribe's name is taken from the Salinas River, as the tribe did not appear to have a name for themselves.

First homesteader

Wilber Judson Harlan was born on December 14, 1860 in Rushville, Rush, Indiana. His father died when he was 21, and Wilber moved to Santa Cruz, California where his half-sister Hester Ann lived with her husband C. J. Todd. After working in a local nursery and on a threshing machine crew in the Salinas Valley, he homesteaded  on the south Big Sur coast. 

Wilber Harlan grew up on a ranch owned by his parents George and Esther Harlan on Lopez Point. His mother first arrived in the Big Sur area from San Jose in 1913 to become a school teacher at the Redwood School. George volunteered to meet the new teacher at the King City rail road station in the Salinas Valley. He brought her to the coast on a two-day horseback trip that included an overnight stay in Wagon Cave in the upper San Antonio River valley. They married and settled on the land in 1876. 

When Esther was ready to give birth, she left the coastal family ranch and visited her mother in Campbell, California until the baby was born. She returned south a week after her son Stan's birth. On the final leg of the trip, over the narrow mountain trails, he was placed in a five-gallon kerosene can, which had one side cut out and lined with blankets, then placed and tied on the pack saddle of George's favorite mule, Big Jack.  

Dani family 
 
Elizabeth and Gabriel Dani homesteaded on land next to the Harlan's. They were members of the Church of Jesus Christ of Latter-day Saints who had been married in Utah in 1847. They had three children in Utah including Ada born in Parowan, Beaver County on January 13, 1867. The family moved to Sutter's Mill, California, where Gabriel worked in the mines. They then took a ship to Wilmington in southern California. A son Gabriel was born there in 1869. In 1871 they moved north again to San Juan Bautista where they had two more sons. Five years later they moved to the Big Sur coast. Four more children were born there from 1878 to 1885.

Harlan married Ada Dani on July 7, 1889. They had 11 children. On March 8, 1900, the Lucia Post Office was opened in the home of Elizabeth and Gabriel Dani. Ada's sister Violet Lucia Dani (1878-1947) was the first postmaster. While Violet was postmaster, it served about 65 local residents. In 1906, Ada became the second postmaster. She was succeeded by her daughter Lulu May Harlan who served until the post office was closed in 1932. George Harlan rode his horse Trixie to carry mail from Jolon to Lucia Post Office from 1922 to 1934. Ada's brother Isiah "Ty" Dani ran the ranch after their parents moved to King City in 1905. He sold the land to Gordon Moore around 1925. 

The Harlan house burned down on December 12, 1926. The Benedictine Order of Camaldolese monks acquired the Lucia Ranch property in 1958. Soon after, the Dani house burned down. The hermitage became known as the Immaculate Heart Hermitage.

Remote region  

Due to the difficult terrain and lack of access, settlement of the Big Sur region was primarily concentrated in the north near the Big Sur River and in the south near Lucia. About two or three dozen individual homesteads dotted a  stretch of coast between the two in the 1890s. The California coast south of Posts and north of San Simeon remained one of the most remote regions in the state, rivaling at the time nearly any other region in the United States for its difficult access.  

The northern and southern regions of the coast were isolated from one another. The northern residents used a rough dirt road  to transport cattle and products to and from Monterey, but counted on a steamship to deliver goods once a year that could not be transported on a wagon. The families on the south coast, including the Harlans, Danis, Gamboas, and Lopezes, used a foot trail to herd cattle, pigs, goats, and even turkeys to market several times a year. The trail climbed  over the steep Santa Lucia Mountain Range to near Cone Peak and then followed what is today known as the Carrizo Trail. From Cone Peak the trail ran easterly along a ridge until it finally descended to Wagon Cave on the north fork of the San Antonio River. 

The  Wagon Cave rock formation is an archeological site that was used by the Salinan Antonianos subtribe who lived in the vicinity of the Wagon Caves. Researchers believe they occupied at least two villages in the area. The rock overhangs and caves have fire-scarred roofs that bear evidence of occupancy over hundreds of years. The Wagon Cave Research Natural Area of  contains diverse stands of Valley Oaks of varying ages and densities and has been recommended as a Research Natural Areas within the Los Padres National Forest. 

Before the completion of the coast highway, Wagon Cave was used as a resting point and overnight camp site for those traveling to and from the coast. Travelers on horseback switched to wagons stored there for the purpose of transporting goods to market and provisions home. From the Caves there was a  wagon road to Jolon. In 1878, Jolon had two grocers, a butcher, a blacksmith, a harness maker, a general merchandise store, post office, and Wells Fargo station. The families brought back supplies necessary to sustain their remote lives. 

William Randolph Hearst developed an interest in acquiring more land to add to the ranch his father George Hearst had purchased, but Harlen refused to sell.

Lucia Lodge 

The lodge was built in the 1930s by Forest Delamater who leased the land from Wilber Harlan. In 1936, the Lucia Post Office reopened at the newly constructed Lucia Lodge but subsequently closed again in 1938. In 1937, the Lucia store opened coinciding with the opening of Big Sur Coast Highway. Lucia also had a gas station as well.

Delamater operated the lodge until his death. His wife continued until Lulu Harlan and her husband Marion took over in 1964. In 1970, their nephew John became manager for the next decade, and then his sons Kenneth and Keith took over. Another nephew, Kenneth James, currently runs the lodge. The lodge was built with local redwood lumber.

The Lucia Lodge consists of ten cabins situated on a 300-foot cliff overlooking the Pacific Ocean. The fifth generation Harlan descendants still operate the cabins. The Honeymoon Cabin (Unit 10) has exceptionally good views. The rooms do not have televisions or telephones. It is rumored that the lodge is haunted. Lucia Lodge included a general store and a restaurant facing the ocean that served lunch and dinner year round and breakfast only in the summer.  Both were heavily damaged by a fire in August 2021. The cabins located 100 yards north of the restaurant were not damaged.

In popular culture 

In 2019, the Netflix series Ratched, a prequel to One Flew over the Cuckoo’s Nest, was filmed on site at the lodge. The lodge saw a spike in bookings following the release of the series.

References

External links 
 Lucia Lodge Website

Additional reading 
 Harlan, Stanley, My Mom and Dad on the south coast of Big Sur 2018 

Big Sur